The 2008 Chinese Figure Skating Championships were held between December 21 and 24, 2007 in Jilin City. Skaters competed in the disciplines of men's singles, ladies' singles, pair skating, and ice dancing on the senior and junior levels.

Senior results

Men

Ladies

Pairs

Ice dancing

External links
 results

Chinese Figure Skating Championships
2007 in figure skating
Chinese Figure Skating Championships, 2008